Night of Temptation is a 1932 German drama film directed by Léo Lasko and Robert Wohlmuth and starring Werner Fuetterer, Elga Brink and Josef Eichheim.

It was shot at the Emelka Studios in Munich. The film's sets were designed by the art director Ludwig Reiber and Willy Reiber.

Cast
 Werner Fuetterer
 Elga Brink
 Josef Eichheim
 Lotte Deyers
 Walter Lantzsch
 Otto Wernicke
 Therese Giehse
 Ludwig Rupert
 Max Schreck
 Ernst Schlott
 Toni Forster-Larrinaga
 Ola Ocouma
 Alexandre Mihalesco
 Karl Raab

References

Bibliography

External links 
 

1932 films
1932 drama films
Films of the Weimar Republic
German drama films
1930s German-language films
Films directed by Léo Lasko
Films directed by Robert Wohlmuth
Bavaria Film films
Films shot at Bavaria Studios
German black-and-white films
1930s German films